Fontclaireau is a former commune in the Charente department in southwestern France. On 1 January 2023, it was merged into the new commune of Mansle-les-Fontaines.

Population

See also
Communes of the Charente department

References

Former communes of Charente